Nickolas George Ramus, also known and credited as Nick Ramus, (September 9, 1929 – May 30, 2007) was a Blackfoot Native American actor, best known for his appearances on television.

Early life
Ramus was born in Seattle, Washington, and grew up in Spokane, but as a boy, his family moved to the Blackfeet Reservation in Browning, Montana.

He eventually moved back to Washington, obtaining a bachelor's degree in chemistry, while minoring in zoology. After dropping out of his first year in medical school, he migrated south, competing in boxing and motorcycle races.

In San Francisco, Ramus received coaching in drama and voice, eventually leading to work in commercials. Several years later, he moved to Los Angeles and picked roles in films and television.

Career
Being of both Blackfoot and Greek ancestry, Ramus portrayed American Indian and Hispanic characters during his 30-year career.

His television debut was a role in the ABC series, The Wide World of Mystery (1973).

In television movies and miniseries, he appeared as Grey Cloud in Born to the Wind (1981), as Arapaho Chief Lost Eagle in Centennial (1978-1979), as Tehohane in The Chisholms (1980), and as Red Cloud in Son of the Morning Star (1991). He also appeared as Mangus Colorado in the TNT film Geronimo (1993).

In television series he had a recurring roles in the soap opera Falcon Crest as Gus Nunouz, and as Chief Black Kettle in Dr. Quinn, Medicine Woman. Guest appearances also include Gunsmoke, Harry and the Hendersons,  Little House on the Prairie, MacGyver, Northern Exposure, Stingray, and Walker, Texas Ranger, among others.

On the big screen, Ramus' film debut was a role in Black Eye (1974). He would go on to star in the first Native American language film Windwalker (1980). Other film roles include The Apple Dumpling Gang Rides Again (1979) as Indian Chief, Invasion U.S.A. (1985), Star Trek IV: The Voyage Home (1986) as Saratoga Helmsman, Love at Stake (1987) as Chief Wannatoka, Journey to Spirit Island (1992), and 3 Ninjas Knuckle Up (1995), among others.

In 2006, Ramus took the role as Local Guy in the independent short film, Alma (2007) featuring Carmen Corral (as Alma) who portrays a Mexican-immigrant teenager, unaware that she is undocumented. The film's executive producer was Victoria Westover, a program director for the Hanson Film Institute at the University of Arizona.

Ramus also wrote, An Evening with Sitting Bull in the 1990s, from which he performed a one-man show.

Personal life
Ramus married Harriet Mary Howard and had three children. He was remarried to Kaysie McCallister in 1995, and moved to the San Pedro River valley area, near Benson, Arizona in 2002. By that time he had retired, except for occasional appearances.

Death
Ramus developed pneumonia in January of 2007, and doctors found a neoplasm in his lungs. He opted out of surgery that could have potentially been debilitating. On May 30, 2007, Ramus died in Benson, Arizona at age 77.

Filmography

Film

Television

References

External links

 

1929 births
2007 deaths
Blackfeet Nation people
Native American male actors
American male television actors
American male film actors
Male actors from Seattle
People from Benson, Arizona
20th-century American male actors